All Through the Night: Julie London Sings the Choicest of Cole Porter is an LP album by Julie London, released by Liberty Records under catalog number LRP-3434 as a monophonic recording and catalog number LST-7434 in stereo in 1965. She was accompanied by the Bud Shank Quintet.

Track listing
(all songs by Cole Porter)

Personnel
Julie London - vocals
Bud Shank - alto saxophone, flute
Joe Pass - guitar
Monty Budwig - bass
Russ Freeman - piano, arrangements
Colin Bailey - drums

References

Liberty Records albums
1965 albums
Julie London albums
Cole Porter tribute albums